Betina Vadimovna Popova (born 2 November 1996) is a Russian retired competitive ice dancer. With partner Sergey Mozgov, she was the 2017 CS Warsaw Cup champion. With former partner Yuri Vlasenko, she was the 2014–15 JGP Final bronze medalist.

Early life 
Betina Vadimovna Popova was born on 2 November 1996 in Vladivostok, Primorsky Krai, Russia. She started skating in 2002. Her first coach was Marina Selitskaya.

Partnership with Vlasenko 
Popova and Yuri Vlasenko began competing together in 2009. The two were coached by Ksenia Rumiantseva and Ekaterina Zhurina at the Sambo-70 club in Moscow.

Popova/Vlasenko's international debut came at the 2011 NRW Trophy. They placed seventh at the Russian Junior Championships in the 2012–13 season.

2013–14 season 
Popova/Vlasenko made their ISU Junior Grand Prix debut in the 2013–14 season. They won the silver medal in Minsk, Belarus and then gold in Ostrava, Czech Republic. Their results qualified them for the JGP Final in Fukuoka, Japan, where they placed fourth. After taking the bronze medal at the 2014 Russian Junior Championships, the two were assigned to the 2014 World Junior Championships and finished seventh in Sofia, Bulgaria.

2014–15 season 
Popova/Vlasenko's first assignment of the 2014–15 JGP season was in Ostrava, Czech Republic. Ranked second in the short dance and fourth in the free dance, they finished second to Canada's Mackenzie Bent / Garrett MacKeen by a margin of 6.75 points. Popova/Vlasenko were awarded gold in Dresden, Germany after placing first in both segments and outscoring Lorraine McNamara / Quinn Carpenter of the United States by 7.96 points. At the 2014–15 JGP Final in Barcelona, they won the bronze medal behind Alla Loboda / Pavel Drozd. The two finished eleventh at the 2015 World Junior Championships in Tallinn, Estonia.

2015–16 season 
Competing in the 2015–16 JGP series, Popova/Vlasenko outscored Angélique Abachkina / Louis Thauron of France by 7.3 points for the gold in Riga, Latvia. They took silver at their JGP assignment in Logroño, Spain – finishing second to another French team, Marie-Jade Lauriault / Romain Le Gac, by a margin of 1.78 points – and qualified for their third JGP Final. At the final, held in December in Barcelona, Popova/Vlasenko finished fourth, having scored 0.45 less than the bronze medalists, Rachel Parsons / Michael Parsons of the United States. After taking silver behind Loboda/Drozd at the Russian Junior Championships, they were assigned to the World Junior Championships in Debrecen, Hungary.

Partnership with Mozgov 
On 2 May 2016, Popova confirmed that she and Sergey Mozgov had formed a partnership, with Elena Kustarova and Svetlana Alexeeva serving as their coaches.

Popova/Mozgov made their international debut at the 2016 CS Golden Spin of Zagreb where they placed fifth.

2017–18 season 
In 2017–18 season they competed at three ISU Challenger Series competitions. They won the gold medal at the 2017 CS Warsaw Cup with a personal best score of 164.07 points. They also won the bronze medal at the 2017 CS Ondrej Nepela Trophy. At the 2017 CS Finlandia Trophy they placed fifth.

In October 2017 they made their Grand Prix debut at the 2017 Rostelecom Cup where they placed sixth. In December 2017 they competed at the 2018 Russian Championships where they placed fourth after placing fifth in the short dance and third in the free dance.

In May 2018 Anjelika Krylova and Oleg Volkov became their new coaches.

2018–19 season 
Popova/Mozgov started their season in mid September at the 2018 CS Ondrej Nepela Trophy where they won the bronze medal with a personal best score of 170.47 points. In early November they placed seventh at the 2018 Grand Prix of Helsinki. Three weeks later they finished eighth at the 2018 Internationaux de France. In early December they won their second Challenger Series bronze medal of the season at the 2018 CS Golden Spin of Zagreb.

They placed fourth at the Russian Championships for the second consecutive year.

In March, Popova/Mozgov have participated in the 2019 Winter Universiade in Krasnoyarsk Russia. They finished first in the short and second in the free, earning the gold medal with a total of 183.01 points.

2019–20 season 
Popova/Mozgov took time off to heal injuries following their Universiade victory, and then resumed training for the new season.  The two selected "Bohemian Rhapsody" as their free dance music, believing it would be a new sort of material for them.  They placed fourth at the 2019 CS Ondrej Nepela Memorial and then won the bronze medal at the 2019 CS Finlandia Trophy.  Given one Grand Prix assignment, they placed eighth at the 2019 Skate Canada International.

Popova/Mozgov announced their retirement from competition on February 14, 2020, with Popova indicating that she was dealing with an eating disorder.

Post-competitive life and career 
Popova began working as a skating choreographer in Moscow, including with the pairs team of Daria Pavliuchenko and Denis Khodykin.  Popova and Khodykin married in August of 2020, but did not announce this until the following May.

Popova indicated her disaffection with the realities of ice dancing at a young age, sharing in 2020 that she was asked to show “sex” and “passion” towards her older partner when she was fourteen.

Programs

With Mozgov

With Vlasenko

Competitive highlights 
GP: Grand Prix; CS: Challenger Series; JGP: Junior Grand Prix

With Mozgov

With Vlasenko

Detailed results
Small medals for short and free programs awarded only at ISU Championships. At team events, medals awarded for team results only.

With Mozgov

With Vlasenko

References

External links 

 
 
 

1996 births
Russian female ice dancers
Living people
Sportspeople from Vladivostok
Universiade gold medalists for Russia
Universiade medalists in figure skating
Competitors at the 2019 Winter Universiade